History of Buddhism in India and Tibet is a historical work written by Buton Rinchen Drub, a famous Sakya master in 1322.

It was translated into English by Eugene Obermiller in 1931.

published
 Obermiller, E.: The history of Buddhism (Chos ḥbyung) by Bu-ston. I The Jewellery of Scripture, II The history of Buddhism in India and Tibet. Harrassowitz 1931–2. Reprint 1986, New Delhi: Sri Satguru Publications.

References

1322 books
History of Tibet
Tibetan literature
Tibetan Buddhist treatises